Marena is a village in the municipality of Kavadarci, North Macedonia.

Demographics
According to the statistics of Bulgarian ethnographer Vasil Kanchov from 1900, 576 inhabitants lived in Marena, 300 Muslim Bulgarians, 270 Christian Bulgarians and 6 Romani. On the 1927 ethnic map of Leonhard Schulze-Jena, the village is shown as having a mixed population of Bulgarians and Muslim Bulgarians.According to the 2002 census, the village had a total of 997 inhabitants. Ethnic groups in the village include:

Macedonians 903
Serbs 21
Romani 71
Others 2

Sports
Local football club FK Marena play in the Macedonian Third League (Center Division).

References

Villages in Kavadarci Municipality